The Prime Minister's Cup is an annual football competition in Laos, first established in 2003 to provide a platform for teams outside of Vientiane to compete against those in the Lao League In addition to encouraging the development of football across Laos, the cup is also intended to encourage regional players to take their place in the national team and to celebrate the National Day of Laos on December 2.

The Prime Minister's Cup is currently sponsored by Beerlao and is called the "Battle of the Provinces.

Format
The current format for the 2012 cup consisted of a qualifying stage for regional teams. This consisted of three groups of four teams who played each other in a round robin format. The group stage was played at the Savannakhet Stadium in Savannakhet, the Champasak Stadium in Pakse and the Luang Prabang Stadium in Luang Prabang. The winners of these groups then joined the top teams from the 2012 Lao League for a further group stage, this time divided into two groups, who again play each other in a round robin format. The top two teams in the two groups then proceed to the semi final knockout round to determine the two teams who will play in the final.

Previous winners
 2003: MCTPC FC (Ministry of Communication, Transportation and Construction)
 2004: Vientiane FC
 2005: Not held due to conflict with Laos National Games and 2005 Southeast Asian Games
 2006: Lao-American College FC
 2007: MPWT FC (Ministry of Public Works and Transport)
 2008: Not held
 2009: Not held
 2010: Lao Bank FC
 2011: Lao Bank FC
2012:   SHB Champasak
2013:  Lao Army
2015:  Lanexang United

References

Football competitions in Laos
National association football cups
Prime Minister's Cup